John H. Admire is a retired U.S. Marine major general. Admire is a decorated veteran of Vietnam War and previously served as commanding general of 1st Marine Division.

Marine career
Admire was commissioned in the United States Marine Corps as a second lieutenant after graduation from University of Oklahoma in 1967. He graduated from The Basic School at Marine Corps Base Quantico and served as Infantry Platoon Leader in Republic of Vietnam with 3rd Battalion, 3rd Marines. He later became an Infantry Battalion Advisor to the Vietnamese Marine Corps. He served as company commander in 2nd Marine Division. He served during Operation Desert Shield/Desert Storm. As a major, Admire joined the 5th Marine Regiment as the executive officer.

His staff assignments include Marine detachment, Guantanamo Bay Naval Base, Cuba; Training Officer for the 1st Marine Division; Marine Corps Legislative Liaison to the United States Congress; Headquarters Marine Corps, Washington, D.C.; Senior White House Military Aide for President Jimmy Carter; branch chief for the Operations Directorate at the United States European Command Headquarters in Germany; and Vice Director for Strategic Plans and Policy Joint Staff at the Pentagon, in Washington, D.C. Upon promotion to major general, Admire served as Commanding General, 1st Marine Division. Admire retired after 33 years of service in 1998.
Author: Darker Than Dark, a story of the Vietnam War and four young Marines, 2015.

Awards and decorations

References

Living people
Year of birth missing (living people)
Recipients of the Gallantry Cross (Vietnam)
Recipients of the Legion of Merit
United States Marine Corps generals
Recipients of the Defense Superior Service Medal
United States Marine Corps personnel of the Vietnam War
United States Marine Corps personnel of the Gulf War
 University of Oklahoma alumni